Municipal Corporation Stadium may refer to one of the following stadia in India:

Howrah Municipal Corporation Stadium in Howrah
Municipal Corporation Stadium, Kozhikode in Kozhikode
Thrissur Municipal Corporation Stadium in Kerala
Municipal Corporation Stadium, Visakhapatnam in Andhra Pradesh
Municipal Stadium, Vijayawada in Andhra Pradesh